The London and North Western Railway (LNWR) Precursor class was a class of forty  steam locomotives designed by F. W. Webb and built at the railway's Crewe Works between 1874 and 1879.

History
The Precursor class was the first locomotive class to be designed wholly by F. W. Webb. He had previously ordered further examples of his predecessor's Samson and Newton classes.

The class featured enclosed wheel splashers and cabs from new, but no brakes were initially fitted; some received steam brakes and others vacuum brakes.

They were fitted with  tenders.

Fleet list

References

Precursor1
2-4-0 locomotives
Railway locomotives introduced in 1874
Standard gauge steam locomotives of Great Britain